Commodore Sir William James, 1st Baronet (5 September 1721 – 16 December 1783) was a Welsh naval officer and politician who sat in the British House of Commons representing West Looe from 1774 to 1783. James is best known for his career in India, where he served as an officer in the Bombay Marine, the navy of the East India Company (EIC), and led several successful campaigns against forces commanded by the Angre family.

Born on 5 September 1721 near Milford Haven, James went to sea at an early age. Initially serving on a coaster from Bristol, James entertained a brief stint as a Royal Navy cabin boy before becoming a sea captain engaged in the trade between Britain and its colonies. During the War of Jenkins' Ear, James was briefly imprisoned by the Spanish before being released and making his way back to England during the 1740's, where he married.

In 1747, James entered into the service of the East India Company, serving as first mate onboard two Company ships before being appointed as an officer in the Bombay Marine. Commanding the 44-gun warship Protector, James participated in several successful expeditions against fortresses controlled Angre family, whose ships would frequently launch attacks on Company merchant shipping. He returned to England in 1759 a wealthy man.

Settling down in England, James remarried and purchased an English country house in Eltham, in addition to being elected several times as a director of the East India Company. Harbouring political ambitions, he was elected to the British Parliament in the 1774 general election. James died in his London home on 16 December 1783, leaving behind his wife and two children. Severndroog Castle was built in 1784 by his widow to memorialise him.

Early life

William James was born on 5 September 1721 near the town of Milford Haven, Wales. Information about his parents is extremely scarce; English politician Nathaniel Wraxall wrote that "[his] origin was so obscure as almost to baffle inquiry." His father was variously reported to be either a miller or farmer, and some accounts claimed that James worked as a ploughboy before embarking on a career at sea, reportedly at the age of twelve. 

The first merchant ship that James served onboard was a coastal trading vessel operating out of Bristol, though historian Charles Rathbone Low claimed that by 1738 James, by now at the age of sixteen, had entered into the Royal Navy as a cabin boy. After a few years, James left the navy and became a sea captain, sailing a merchant ship which participated in the trade between Virginia, the British West Indies and Great Britain. 

While serving as a sea captain, James was captured during the War of Jenkins' Ear by the Royal Spanish Navy after his ship was shipwrecked.  He was imprisoned for a period before being released, making his way back to England at some point during the 1740's. There, he married a woman, whose identity was reported to be either the landlady of a Wapping pub or a widow whose husband had been the captain of an East Indiaman.

Career in India

In 1747, James entered into the service of the East India Company (EIC), serving as first mate onboard the Company ship Hardwicke. Two years later in 1749, he was transferred to the Suffolk before becoming an officer in the Bombay Marine, the navy of the EIC. His first command was the warship Guardian, and James served as a senior officer in a small squadron which operated between Bombay (then under Company control) and Goa. 

During this period, the Bombay Marine was primarily focused on protecting Company shipping against attacks from ships commanded by the Angre family. James spent a period of time convoying EIC ships, which led to a reduction in losses. In recognition of his efforts, James was eventually promoted to the rank of Commodore in 1751 and placed in command of the Protector, a 44-gun warship. She had been constructed at the Bombay Dockyard by the East India Company to protect their trade routes on the Malabar Coast.

In April 1755, James participated in an expedition against the fortress of Severndroog, which was controlled by the Angre family, in conjunction with Maratha forces. James led his squadron, which consisted of the Protector, Revenge and Bombay, into the fortress harbour and directed an effective offshore naval bombardment which led to the Severndroog garrison capitulating on 2 April. After taking control of the fortress, James quickly handed over control to his Maratha allies before returning to Bombay in order to avoid the seasonal monsoons damaging his squadron.

Seven months later, a Royal Navy squadron commanded by Charles Watson arrived in Bombay, linking up with James and Colonel Robert Clive. The British decided to mount another expedition against the Angre family. On February 1756, a British force sailed from Bombay to attack a fortress at Gheriah which was under the Angre family's control. The British captured the fortress with no casualties, breaking the power of the Angre family. Although control of the fortress was handed over to British-allied Maratha forces, 130,000 rupees worth of loot fell into British hands.

In 1757, James, who was in Bombay, was charged by his superiors with informing Watson, who was commanding a squadron near the French Indian city of Chandernagore, of an outbreak of war between Great Britain and France. As noted by historian T. H. Bowyer, since the seasonal Northeast monsoon made travelling through the Bay of Bengal dangerous, James made a detour via Sumatra, which allowed him to reach the Hooghly River and inform Watson in "exceptionally good time." James continued serving in the Bombay Marine until 1759, when he returned to England.

Later life and death

James had acquired a large fortune during his career in India, primarily through his private business dealings and prize money. Once he had returned to England, James purchased Park Farm Place, an English country house in Eltham, Kent. On 15 June 1765, he remarried to Anne Goddard in St Marylebone Parish Church. James, a supporter of fellow EIC official and politician Laurence Sulivan, was elected as a director of the East India Company in 1768.  

Despite his relationship with Sulivan, James soon began cultivating a friendship with prominent statesman John Montagu, 4th Earl of Sandwich, "whose influence brought him the honours that he enjoyed." On 22 July 1769, he was appointed as an elder brother of Trinity House, before rising to the position of deputy master in 1778. During this period, James was also served as a governor of Greenwich Hospital, a permanent home for retired British sailors.

James also started to harbour political ambitions, unsuccessfully running in a parliamentary by-election for the New Shoreham constituency in 1770. Although he was also attempting to secure the governorship of Bombay during this period, James withdrew his candidature after making his political aspirations clear to government officials. In the 1774 British general election, James was elected to the House of Commons, representing West Looe.

In Parliament, James continued to support both the Earl of Sandwich and the ministry of incumbent Prime Minister Lord North. However, his relationship with Sulivan started to deteriorate when under government pressure James voted for the recall of EIC official Warren Hastings. In 1776, James secured a government contract to provision British forces stationed in Canada; in the same year, he was also elected as a deputy chairman of the East India Company. 

On 27 August 1778, James was granted a baronetcy, the same date as he was re-elected as deputy chairman. His relationship with Sulivan had improved to the point where James was twice elected as chairman again, in 1779 and 1781. Together, the two successfully defended accusations from a parliamentary committee that they had secretly altered EIC records in order to mislead the committee, maintaining that the charges were "without foundation." James died at his home on Gerrard Street, London on 16 December 1783, and was buried at Eltham six days later.

Personal life, family and legacy

According to Bowyer, James "seems never to have shown any inclination to shed light on the first thirty years of his life; he left no tracks, only conjecture." He had two children with his second wife Anne, a son named Edward and a daughter named Elizabeth. Edward, who was born in 1774, succeeded his father's title and died unmarried in 1792, leading to the baronetcy becoming extinct. Elizabeth, named as sole heir of James' estate, married Thomas Parkyns, who was later elevated to the Irish peerage as Baron Rancliffe. Together, the couple had nine children.

During and after his career in India, rumours developed that James had married an Indian woman and had a son named Richard who was supposedly the first person of Asian descent to succeed to a British title; these have been dismissed as baseless by Bowyer. Relationships between European employees of the East India Company and Indian women were common during the 18th century; Scottish historian William Dalrymple noted in his 2004 work White Mughals that roughly one in three wills left by EIC employees during this period left something to an Indian spouse.

After James died, Anne commissioned English architect Richard Jupp to construct Severndroog Castle, a triangular Gothic folly built in 1784. The building was constructed at the summit of Shooter's Hill near Blackheath, and was intended by Anne to serve as a memorial to her husband, being named after the site of his most famous victory. During the First World War, Severndroog Castle served as an observation post for a detachment of Special Constabulary officers, who were charged with detecting incoming air raids over London by the Luftstreitkräfte.

James' victories over the Angre family have been seen by historians David Cordingly and John Falconer as marking a turning point for the fortunes of the East India Company in establishing naval supremacy in India. They noted that prior to James' arrival in India, the Bombay Marine had participated in several unsuccessful battles against the Angre family, who after their defeats at Severndroog and Gheriah ceased to pose an effective threat to Company shipping. The pair attributed James' victories to the EIC's superior ship-making skills vis-à-vis that of the Angre family.

References

Footnotes

Bibliography

 
 
 
 
 
 
 
 
 
 
 
 
 
 
 
 

1722 births
1783 deaths
18th-century Royal Navy personnel
18th-century Welsh politicians
Baronets in the Baronetage of Great Britain
British East India Company Marine personnel
British MPs 1774–1780
British MPs 1780–1784
Directors of the British East India Company
Members of the Parliament of Great Britain for English constituencies
Members of the Parliament of Great Britain for West Looe
People from Pembrokeshire
Welsh sailors